Crugers station was a commuter rail stop on the Metro-North Railroad's Hudson Line, located in the hamlet of Crugers, New York. It was closed in 1996 when it and the next station northbound, Montrose, was replaced by the Cortlandt station between them.

History 
The station, which still remains in part, was replaced, along with Montrose, as the last stage of expanding the Hudson Line to six-car high-level platforms and a track curvature at the station precluded such a conversion. Together, they recorded 332 riders in the morning peak in 1991. While they could be converted to high-level platforms, there was no space to lengthen the platforms or provide expanded parking because the station was surrounded by protected wetlands as well as a bridge abutment adjacent to the station prohibiting such expansion. The station had 48 parking spaces for commuter usage. It also has a bridge over the south end of Crugers Station Road and the tracks that still exists. The station closed on June 30, 1996.

References

External links
Former Crugers Metro-North Station (Road and Rail Pictures)

Metro-North Railroad stations in New York (state)
Former New York Central Railroad stations
Railway stations in Westchester County, New York
Railway stations closed in 1996
1996 disestablishments in New York (state)